SS Breda was a Dutch cargo-passenger ship sunk in Scotland during World War II.

Construction
The ship was built at the Nieuwe Waterweg Scheepsbouwmaatschappij ("New Waterway Shipbuilding Company") yard at Schiedam for the Koninklijke Nederlandsche Stoomboot Maatschappij ("Royal Netherlands Steamship Company"). Laid down on 16 December 1919, she was not launched until 2 July 1921, and finally completed on 10 December 1921. She had five cargo holds, and could also accommodate up to 87 passengers.

Ship history
After the invasion of the Netherlands in May 1940 the Breda fled to Britain, where she was placed under the control of the P&O Line, and armed with a single  gun.

On 23 December 1940 she was laying off Oban, part of a convoy being assembled that was bound for Bombay. She carried a mixed general cargo that included 3,000 tons of cement, 175 tons of tobacco and cigarettes, three Hawker and 30 de Havilland Tiger Moth biplanes, army lorries, NAAFI crockery, copper ingots, rubber-soled sandals, banknote paper, ten horses and nine dogs.

At dusk a group of Heinkel He 111 bombers flying from Stavanger, Norway, swept across the anchorage, and straddled the Breda with four  bombs. The force of the explosions ruptured a water inlet pipe, and the engine room was rapidly flooded, depriving the ship of power. She was quickly taken under tow, and beached in shallow water in Ardmucknish Bay.

The ship has since become a popular dive site, marked by buoys.

References 

 

1921 ships
Maritime incidents in December 1940
World War II merchant ships of the Netherlands
World War II shipwrecks in the Atlantic Ocean
Wreck diving sites in Scotland
Ships sunk by German aircraft
Ships built in Schiedam
1921 in the Netherlands
1940 in Scotland
Oban
History of Argyll and Bute